Série noire is a French crime television series created by Pierre Grimblat in 1984. The series was adapted from crime books by the publishing imprint of the same name. 37 episodes were filmed between 1984 and 1989, and were aired until 1991 on TF1.

Guest stars

 Agnès Soral
 Alex Descas
 Artus de Penguern
 Bernard Farcy
 Colette Brosset
 Danièle Lebrun
 Dominique Pinon
 Évelyne Buyle
 Fabrice Luchini
 François Berléand
 Gérard Darmon
 Ginette Garcin
 Jean Benguigui
 Jean-François Stévenin
 Jean-Luc Bideau
 Jean-Pierre Castaldi
 Jean-Yves Berteloot
 Liliane Rovère
 Luc Béraud
 Mylène Demongeot
 Ronny Coutteure
 Rufus
 Suzanne Flon
 Véronique Genest
 Victor Lanoux
 Vincent Grass

References

External links

1984 French television series debuts
French crime television series
TF1 original programming